{{Infobox martial artist
| name           = Gabi Garcia
| image          = Gabi Garcia.png
| caption        = Gabi Garcia in 2016
| birth_name     = Gabrielle Lemos Garcia
| birth_date     = 
| nickname       = 
| birth_place    = Porto Alegre, Brazil
| residence      = Eastvale, California
| style          = Brazilian Jiu-Jitsu| height         = 187 cm
| weight         = 95 kg
| team           = Alliance Jiu Jitsu
| rank           =  3rd deg. BJJ black belt| wrestling      = 
| university     = 
| school         = 
| years_active   = 2008–present| mma_kowin      = 2
| mma_subwin     = 4
| mma_decwin     = 
| mma_koloss     = 
| mma_subloss    = 
| mma_decloss    = 
| mma_draw       = 
| mma_nc         = 1
| url            = 
| sherdog        = 181735
| footnotes      = 
| updated        = 
| medaltemplates = 

}}

Gabrielle "Gabi" Lemos Garcia is a Brazilian mixed martial artist, 9x Brazilian Jiu-Jitsu (BJJ) World Champion, 11x Pan Jiu-Jitsu Champion and 4x ADCC Submission Fighting World champion. One of the most successful competitors of all time in the female black belt divisions, and a member of the IBJJF Hall of Fame. 

In December 2021, Garcia announced that she was officially retiring from IBJJF competition.

 Early life
Gabi Garcia was born on November 17, 1985 in Porto Alegre, Rio Grande do Sul, Brazil. Garcia's early and mid-teens were spent playing sports including volleyball, team handball, and field hockey. At age 13, Garcia and her family moved to São Paulo. Around this age, Garcia's uncle helped begin her training in Jiu-Jitsu. Before eventually committing herself full-time to a Jiu-Jitsu career, Garcia was in her final year of a university course study in advertising.

 Jiu Jitsu and grappling 
Garcia trains in São Paulo with Fabio Gurgel, at the Alliance team, where she has achieved four Abu Dhabi Combat Club championships and nine World Jiu-Jitsu Championships.

Garcia's results from the 2013 IBJJF World Jiu-Jitsu Championships were automatically disqualified when she tested positive for the fertility drug Clomiphene, which is on the USADA banned list. After a case review, Garcia was found not at fault, no suspension was given and she remained eligible to compete.

In 2019, Garcia became the first woman to win four ADCC gold medals with a submission in the finals against Carina Santi.

In 2021, following a WNO (Who's Number One ) fight against Nathiely De Jesus, Garcia called for a match between her and Gordon Ryan. ADCC medalist Craig Jones verbally agreed to compete against her in an intergender match, the match has not been officially booked for any promotion as yet.

At the 2021 IBJJF World Championships, Garcia was submitted for the first time in the history of her competitive career at black belt by Yara Soares and she retired from IBJJF competition at the conclusion of the competition.

Garcia was then invited to compete at the 2022 ADCC World Championship in the over 60kg division once again. She submitted Nikki Lloyd-Griffiths in the opening round with an armbar, but then lost to Amy Campo on points in the semi-final. She won the bronze medal by default after Kendall Reusing was injured in her match and unable to compete.

Instructor lineage
Jigoro Kano → Tomita Tsunejirō → Mitsuyo Maeda → Carlos Gracie Sr. → Hélio Gracie → Rolls Gracie → Romero Cavalcanti → Fábio Gurgel → Gabi Garcia

 Mixed martial arts 
Garcia appeared as a guest coach for Wanderlei Silva on The Ultimate Fighter: Brazil 3.

Garcia was at one point scheduled to face Megumi Yabushita for the Japanese promotion Real Fight Championship. This bout, however, fell through.

Garcia was then scheduled to make her MMA debut with Jungle Fight in March 2015. However, this bout also didn't happen.

On November 6, 2015, it was announced during Bellator 145 that Garcia would face Lei'D Tapa for Rizin Fighting Federation on December 31, 2015. She won the fight via TKO in the first round.

In her second fight for the promotion, Garcia faced Anna Malyukova at Rizin Fighting Federation 1 on April 17, 2016. She won the fight via armbar submission in the second round.

For her third fight with Rizin, Garcia faced Destanie Yarbrough at Rizin World Grand-Prix 2016: 1st Round on September 25, 2016. She won the fight via americana submission in the first round.

Garcia was scheduled to face Shinobu Kandori at Rizin 4: Rizin Fighting World Grand Prix 2016: Final Round on December 31, 2016. However, Kandori pulled out of the bout due to an injury and was replaced by Yumiko Hotta. Garcia won the bout via TKO in the first round.

Garcia next faced Russian boxer Oksana Gagloeva on July 30, 2017, at Rizin 6. The bout ended in a No Contest due to an eye poke that occurred just fourteen seconds into the first round.

Garcia was scheduled to face Shinobu Kandori on December 29 at Rizin World Grand Prix 2017: 2nd Round, but the fight was canceled when Garcia missed weight by 28 pounds.

Garcia faced Barbara Nepomuceno at Rizin 14 on December 31, 2018, in a 226 lb catchweight bout. She won the fight via submission in the first round.

In 2023, Garcia announced that she would be returning to professional MMA competition and that she would be competing at 195lbs.

 Shoot boxing 
Garcia made her shoot boxing debut on July 7, 2017 when she faced Megumi Yabushita at Shoot Boxing Girl's S-Cup 2017. The bout was declared a No Contest after twice hitting Yabushita with illegal soccer kicks when her opponent fell to the ground.

 Mixed martial arts record 

|-
|Win
|align=center| 6–0 (1)
| Barbara Nepomuceno
|Submission (keylock)
|Rizin 14
|
|align=center|1
|align=center|2:35
|Saitama, Japan
|
|-
|Win
|align=center| 5–0 (1)
|Veronika Futina
|Submission (rear-naked choke)
|Road FC 047
|
|align=center| 1
|align=center| 3:49
|Beijing, China
|
|-
|NC
|align=center| 4–0 (1)
|Oksana Gagloeva
|No Contest (eye poke)
|Rizin World Grand Prix 2017 Opening Round – Part 1
|
|align=center|1
|align=center|0:14
|Saitama, Japan
|Eyepoke rendered Gagloeva unable to continue.
|-
|Win
|align=center| 4–0
|Yumiko Hotta
|TKO (punches)
|Rizin 4: Rizin Fighting World Grand Prix 2016: Final Round
|
|align=center| 1
|align=center| 0:41
|Saitama, Japan
|
|-
|Win
|align=center| 3–0
|Destanie Yarbrough
|Submission (keylock)
|Rizin World Grand-Prix 2016: 1st Round
|
|align=center| 1
|align=center| 2:42
|Saitama, Japan
|
|-
|Win
|align=center|2–0
|Anna Malyukova
|Submission (armbar)
|Rizin Fighting Federation 1
|
|align=center|2
|align=center|2:04
|Nagoya, Japan
|
|-
| Win
| align=center| 1-0
| Lei'D Tapa
| TKO (punches)
| Rizin Fighting World GP 2015: Iza no Mai
| 
|align=center| 1
|align=center| 2:36
| Saitama, Japan
|

 Shoot boxing record 

|-  style="background:#c5d2ea;"
| 2017-07-07 || NC ||align=left| Megumi Yabushita || Shoot Boxing Girl's S-Cup 2017 || Tokyo, Japan || No Contest (illegal soccer kicks) || 1 || N/A
|-
| colspan=9 | Legend'':

References

External links 
Ibjjf.com
Bjjheroes.com
MARanking (GI) profile
FloGrappling.com

1985 births
Brazilian practitioners of Brazilian jiu-jitsu
People awarded a black belt in Brazilian jiu-jitsu
Female Brazilian jiu-jitsu practitioners
Brazilian Muay Thai practitioners
Female Muay Thai practitioners
Brazilian sportspeople in doping cases
Living people
Sportspeople from Porto Alegre
Brazilian female mixed martial artists
Heavyweight mixed martial artists
Mixed martial artists utilizing shootboxing
Mixed martial artists utilizing Muay Thai
Mixed martial artists utilizing wrestling
Mixed martial artists utilizing Brazilian jiu-jitsu
Brazilian female kickboxers
World Brazilian Jiu-Jitsu Championship medalists
World No-Gi Brazilian Jiu-Jitsu Championship medalists
Brazilian jiu-jitsu world champions (women)
IBJJF Hall of Fame inductees
Doping cases in Brazilian jiu-jitsu
Brazilian jiu-jitsu practitioners who have competed in MMA (women)
ADCC Submission Fighting World Champions (women)